The 2008–09 Mississippi State basketball team represented Mississippi State University in the 2008–09 college basketball season. Under head coach Rick Stansbury, the team played their home games at Humphrey Coliseum in Starkville, Mississippi, and was a member of the Southeastern Conference.

Previous season 
The 2007–08 Bulldogs finished the season 23–11 (12–4 in SEC play) and reached the Round of 32 in the NCAA tournament, where they barely lost to eventual runner-up Memphis.

Before the season

Departures
Five players from the 2007–08 team did not return for this season.

Recruits

Roster

References 

Mississippi State
Mississippi State Bulldogs men's basketball seasons
Mississippi State
Bull
Bull